Warren White may refer to:

Warren White (baseball) (1844–1890), American professional baseball player
Warren White (oceanographer), research oceanographer at the Scripps Institution of Oceanography

See also
Warren White, or the Great White Shark, fictional villain in Batman comics